Barry Railway Class E were  steam locomotives of the Barry Railway in South Wales.  They were designed by J. H. Hosgood and built by Hudswell Clarke.  The locomotive was designed for light shunting duties at the docks.  Their small size made them particularly suited to shunting on the Barry Island Breakwater.  Access to the breakwater was via a rough hewn tunnel whose dimensions and sharp curves made it impossible for the other locomotives to negotiate a way through.

Traffic duties
After their initial use as shunting locomotives, they took on passenger duties on the Vale of Glamorgan Railway.  Two sets of two coaches were prepared for the role.  They comprised a four-wheeled 1888 composite coach and a six-wheeled 1895 brake third which were close coupled.  They were known as 'Motor Sets'.  At one end of the brake third was a driver's compartment which, unusually, did not have regulator equipment to control the locomotive fitted.  Instead a bell system was installed so that the driver could send instructions to the fireman in the locomotive.  The controls available in the driver's compartment were a brake and whistle controls which were operated by wires that ran along the top of the coaches and were attached to pulleys located on the dome and cab roof.  The E Class operated with one set as a push-pull unit or with both sets located either side of the engine.  This arrangement was used mainly on trains between Barry and Llantwit Major.  However, when John Auld was appointed as Locomotive Superintendent in 1909, he did not favour the push-pull arrangement and subsequently ordered that trains should revert to running the engine around the train at the end of its journey.

Withdrawal
The locomotives passed to the Great Western Railway in 1922 and 2 passed to British Railways in 1947.  All were withdrawn between 1932 and 1949.  None have been preserved.

Numbering

See also 
 Barry Docks

References

E
0-6-0T locomotives
Hudswell Clarke locomotives
Railway locomotives introduced in 1889
Standard gauge steam locomotives of Great Britain
Shunting locomotives